This page lists the rosters, by season, of the UCI Women's Team, FDJ Nouvelle-Aquitaine Futuroscope.

2011 
Ages as of 1 January 2011.

2016 
Roster in 2016, ages as of 1 January 2016:

2021

2022
Roster in 2022, ages as of 1 January 2022:

References

Nouvelle-Aquitaine Futuroscope, rosters
FDJ Nouvelle-Aquitaine Futuroscope
FDJ roster